The Villa Empain is a former private residence in Brussels, Belgium, which currently serves as a cultural centre and exhibition space. Built in 1930–1934 in Art Deco style by the Swiss-Belgian architect , the villa was commissioned by Baron Louis Empain, son of the industrialist Édouard Empain. It subsequently served as offices and an embassy before falling into disuse. After a restoration from 2009 to 2011, it was opened to the public by the Boghossian Foundation.

History

Design and construction
Baron Louis Empain (1908–1976) was the second son of Édouard Empain (1852–1929), a respected Belgian industrialist who had spent much of his career in Egypt. In 1930, Louis commissioned the Swiss-Belgian architect  to build a large house in Art Deco style on the edge of the Bois de la Cambre/Ter Kamerenbos, in the emerging southern suburbs of Brussels, on what was then known as the / (now the Avenue Franklin Roosevelt/Franklin Rooseveltlaan).

Built between 1930 and 1934, the Villa Empain is organised around a large enclosed courtyard. It was designed in Art Deco style, and the project aroused significant interest in Belgium where prestigious houses in the style were comparatively rare. Various expensive stone facings were used from around the world.

Later history
Despite the expense incurred in construction, Louis Empain barely used the house after its completion and lived primarily in Canada. In 1937, it was donated to the Belgian State to house a museum of applied arts for the École nationale supérieure d'Architecture et des Arts décoratifs de La Cambre. It was requisitioned by the German Army in November 1943 during the occupation.

After the war, the Villa Empain was ceded to the Soviet Union as an embassy at the initiative of Paul-Henri Spaak. Disapproving of this use, it was reacquired by the Empain family in 1963 and resold in 1973 to Harry Tcherkezian, an Armenian-American tobacco entrepreneur. It was used by Radio-Télévision-Luxembourg (RTL) from 1980 to 1993, before becoming unoccupied after 1995. The building was classified in 2007, but its condition degraded significantly.

In 2007, the Villa Empain was acquired by the Boghossian Foundation. It was restored between 2009 and 2010 and reopened to the public as a museum and cultural centre. The conservation project was awarded the European Union Prize for Cultural Heritage / Europa Nostra Award in 2011.

Exhibitions
 Colors of the Orient, Arts and lifestyles in the Ottoman Empire (2010)
 Of women's modesty and anger (2011) 
 A dream of eternity. The long road of Oriental arts (2011)
 Art is the answer! Contemporary Lebanese artists and designers (2012)
 Edouard and Cleopatra. Egyptomania's from the XIXth century (2012)
 Turbulences II (2013)
 Abandoned Dwellings of Beirut by Gregory Buchakjian (2019)

See also
 Stoclet Palace
 Art Deco in Brussels
 History of Brussels
 Culture of Belgium

References

Notes

Further reading
 
 
 
 
  Carlo R. Chapelle, La Voie lactée ou quelques notes concernant l'hôtel Empain, Bruxelles, 2007 ].

External links

 Website of Villa Empain

Museums in Brussels
Houses in Belgium
Art Deco architecture in Belgium
Buildings and structures in Brussels
Barons Empain
Protected heritage sites in Brussels